The 1995–96 OB I bajnokság season was the 59th season of the OB I bajnokság, the top level of ice hockey in Hungary. Five teams participated in the league, and Dunaferr Dunaujvaros won the championship.

First round

Second round

Playoffs

3rd place 
 Alba Volán Székesfehérvár - Lehel HC Jászberény 2:0 (4:3, 7:2)

Final 
 Dunaferr Dunaújváros - Ferencvárosi TC 2:0 (4:1, 6:3)

External links
 Season on hockeyarchives.info

OB I bajnoksag seasons
Hun
OB